Zanthoxylum mollissimum is a species of plant in the family Rutaceae. It is found in Belize, Costa Rica, El Salvador, Guatemala, Honduras, Nicaragua, and Panama.

References

mollissimum
Taxonomy articles created by Polbot